Working for the Man may refer to:
"Working for the Man" (song), by Roy Orbison
Working for the Man (album), by Tindersticks